S. Gokula Indira is an Indian politician and was a member of the 14th Tamil Nadu Legislative Assembly from the Anna Nagar constituency. She represented the All India Anna Dravida Munnetra Kazhagam party.

She was inducted into Jayalalithaa ministry as Minister of Tourism in 2011. However, in February 2013, she was sacked from the Cabinet, possibly due to underperformance, only to be reinducted as Minister of Handlooms and Textiles in May 2014 in yet another reshuffle.

Indira lost in the elections of 2016 despite her party retaining power. Her constituency was won by M. K. Mohan. She was one among the incumbent 13 ADMK ministers who lost the 2016 polls.

References 

Tamil Nadu MLAs 2011–2016
All India Anna Dravida Munnetra Kazhagam politicians
Living people
State cabinet ministers of Tamil Nadu
Politicians from Chennai
21st-century Indian women politicians
21st-century Indian politicians
Women state cabinet ministers of India
Year of birth missing (living people)
Women members of the Tamil Nadu Legislative Assembly